Alan Ehrenhalt is an American journalist and non-fiction author.

Early life
Alan Ehrenhalt graduated from Brandeis University in 1968. He received a master's degree from the Columbia University Graduate School of Journalism.

Career
Ehrenhalt is a journalist and author. He is the former executive editor and later senior editor of Governing. Additionally, he has been a contributing writer to The New York Times, The New Republic and The Wall Street Journal.

Ehrenhalt was the recipient of the Nieman Fellowship in 1977–1978. He won the Everett McKinley Dirksen Award for Distinguished Reporting of Congress from the National Press Club in 1983. Additionally, he was the recipient of the Carey McWilliams Award from the American Political Science Association in 2000.

Ehrenhalt is the author of four books.

Personal life
Ehrenhalt is married, and he has two daughters. He resides in Arlington, Virginia.

Works

References

External links

Living people
People from Arlington County, Virginia
Brandeis University alumni
Columbia University Graduate School of Journalism alumni
American male journalists
Nieman Fellows
Year of birth missing (living people)